Toliara II is a district of Atsimo-Andrefana in Madagascar.

Communes
The district is further divided into 19 communes:

 Ambohimahavelona
 Ambolofoty
 Analamisampy
 Andranovory
 Ankililoake
 Ankilimalinike
 Antanimena
 Beheloke
 Behompy
 Belalanda
 Mandrofify
 Manombo Sud
 Marofoty
 Maromiandra
 Miary
 Milenaka
 Saint Augustin
 Soalara
 Tsianisiha

References 

Districts of Atsimo-Andrefana